Grace Kim (born April 16, 1968) is a former professional tennis player from the United States.

Biography
Kim grew up in Ridgewood, New Jersey but was born in South Korea. She twice made the third round of the US Open, the first time in 1983 was as a 15-year old. Turning professional in 1984, she was a quarter-finalist that year at the Canadian Open, which included a win over Kathy Horvath. At the 1985 US Open she reached the third round again by beating Bettina Bunge and Mary-Lou Piatek, before falling to top seed Chris Evert. One of her biggest wins came in 1986 when she defeated Gabriela Sabatini en route to the quarter-finals in Zurich.

References

External links
 
 

1968 births
Living people
American female tennis players
South Korean emigrants to the United States
Tennis people from New Jersey
People from Ridgewood, New Jersey
Sportspeople from Bergen County, New Jersey
21st-century American women